Andrej Hrnčiar (born 10 July 1973)  is a Slovak professional actor and politician, who has been serving as mayor of the city of Martin since 2006. He had been a professional actor and a restaurant and bar owner before he decided to run in the 2006 mayoral election as an independent.

He was elected a member of the Slovak parliament in 2012 as an independent, although he was nominated by and associated with the Hungarian-minority Most-Hid party. He resigned his seat in parliament in June 2014, in order to focus on his mayoral career, and to join the newly formed political party Siet'. He became its deputy leader under Radoslav Procházka.

Early life and education 
Hrnčiar was born 10 July 1973 in the northern city of Ruzomberok, in what was then Czechoslovakia. However shortly after his birth his family relocated to the adjacent village of Liptovská Lisková, where he was raised. He returned to Ruzomberok in to attend upper secondary school between 1987 and 1991. After graduating, he enrolled in the Academy of Performing Arts in Bratislava where he would study drama and acting. After graduating with a master's degree in acting, he moved to the United States, where he would work a number of odd jobs, including as a sanitation worker and construction.

Early career 
After returning to Slovakia from the United States in 1996, he was employed as an actor by the Slovak Chamber Theatre in the city of Martin. Around the same time, he opened two Jazz themed cafes in the area, with relative success. The Café's, which soon became the focus of the Slovak Jazz scene, attracted patrons such as Peter Lipa, Adriena Bartošová and Laco Déczi. In 2003, when the position as head of the Chamber Theater became open, Hrnčiar applied and was hired.  Under his tenure, the theatre underwent radical changes. In order to balance the budget, Hrnčiar controversially furloughed over 20% of all employees, actors and actresses included. The theatre bounced back however, and is today considered one of the most prestigious theaters in Slovakia.

Mayor of Martin 
In the Slovak municipal elections in 2006, Hrnčiar decided to run for mayor on an independent ticket. His opponent was incumbent mayor Stanislav Bernát, local strongman candidate, who had won the three previous elections and sitting as mayor since 1994. In the end, Hrnciar won the election with 32.6% of the vote, Bernat came in third with 15.2% Fulfilling an election promise, Hrnčiar introduced an offer of wi-fi internet free of charge for every resident in the city. The offer, which was intended for elderly residents, was ordered by approximately 500 households and considered a success by Hrnciar. In the municipal elections in 2010, Hrnčiar ran again and was reelected to another term, which will last until 2014. In the 2014 Mayoral election, he ran for the first time as an official party nominee, having run the previous times as an independent.

Member of Parliament 
In November 2011, Hrnčiar announced his bid for a seat in the National Council, or Slovak parliament. He made the decision, according to him, after being approached by the leader of the Most-Hid party Bela Bugar, who offered him a place on his partys electoral ticket. Most-Hid, who represents the Hungarian minority in Slovakia, had been eager to broaden its voter base among Slovaks, and saw the benefit in drafting the popular mayor Hrnčiar, who is Slovak. He accepted the offer, but declined membership in the party, thus formally running as an independent.

The campaign turned out to be an ugly one. Hrnčiar received a bullet with his name on it in the mailbox. He had previously received written death threats against himself and his family. Most-Hid ended up receiving 6.89% of the vote, and thus Hrnčiar was elected, along with 12 other MPs including fellow Slovak František Šebej, who Hrnčiar himself had drafted in order to further increase the partys appeal among Slovak voters. Already under fire for receiving a high wage and having multiple jobs as mayor,  Hrnčiar was criticized for serving as both Mayor and MP at the same time, thus receiving dual salary, as well as benefits.

In the run-up to the second round of the 2014 presidential election Hrnciar, along with Radoslav Procházka and Miroslav Beblavy endorsed Andrej Kiska for the presidency. On 7 April 2014, Hrnčiar confirmed he was leaving the Most-Híd caucus to team up with Procházka. He claims his relations within the caucus are fine, but that he believes that in the two years following the last parliamentary election, the centre-right opposition parties have failed to successfully re-establish themselves. Both Hrnciar and Prochazka left gave up their mandates as MPs following the inauguration of president-elect Kiska. The two MPs had announced earlier that they would give up their mandates as MPs after the May parliamentary session. The session ended on Thursday, June 12, in the afternoon.

Personal life 
Hrnčiar is married to Martina Hrnčiarova, a pediatric nurse from the Orava region. They have two daughters, Karin and Tamara. Karin is an accomplished Equestrian, and has participated in national events.

References 

Living people
1973 births
People from Ružomberok
Mayors of places in Slovakia
Members of the National Council (Slovakia) 2012-2016
Members of the National Council (Slovakia) 2016-2020
Slovak actors
Most–Híd politicians
Independent politicians in Slovakia